Andrej Miklavc (born June 5, 1970) is a former alpine skier.

In his career, Miklavc won one Alpine Skiing World Cup Slalom race in ten World Cup seasons and achieved thirteen top ten positions. His only win was the Park City Slalom in the 1995/96 season. Miklavc represented Slovenia at the 1992 Winter Olympics, 1994 Winter Olympics and 1998 Winter Olympics.

World cup results

Season standings

Race podiums

References 

1970 births
Living people
Slovenian male alpine skiers
Olympic alpine skiers of Slovenia
Alpine skiers at the 1992 Winter Olympics
Alpine skiers at the 1994 Winter Olympics
Alpine skiers at the 1998 Winter Olympics
People from the City Municipality of Kranj